Club Universidad Nacional Femenil is a Mexican professional women's football club based in Mexico City that competes in the Liga MX Femenil. The club has been the women's section of Club Universidad Nacional since 2017.

Personnel

Management Staff

Source: Liga MX Femenil

Players

Current squad
As of 1 January 2022

References

 
Liga MX Femenil teams
 
Association football clubs established in 2017
Football clubs in Mexico City
National Autonomous University of Mexico athletics
University and college association football clubs
Women's association football clubs in Mexico
2017 establishments in Mexico